The coastal plain cooter (Pseudemys floridana) or Florida cooter is a species of large herbivorous freshwater turtle in the genus Pseudemys.

Biology
The species is found within the southeastern coastal plain of the United States, from extreme southeastern Virginia southward through all of Florida and westward to the vicinity of Mobile Bay, Alabama. The nominate race (P. f. floridana) occupies most of the species' geographic range but is replaced in the Florida peninsula by the peninsula cooter (Pseudemys peninsularis), which is primarily distinguished by differences in head markings.  Both races can be distinguished from sympatric Pseudemys species by the immaculate yellow color of their plastrons and the lack of a U-shaped cusp in the upper jaw (characteristic of the Florida redbelly turtle). The carapace length of the size ranges from  typically and the normal weigh is (in the slightly larger females) . The record sized female measured  in carapace length.

The cooter is mainly herbivorous and inhabits lakes, sloughs, ponds, slow-flowing streams, and other still bodies of water with soft bottoms and abundant aquatic vegetation.  However, it can be found in high densities in some Florida spring runs, usually in heavily vegetated areas with little flow. This species is active year-round and spends a large portion of the day basking on logs.

Coastal cooters are frequently exported for consumption and the pet trade, with about 60% wild caught individuals and 40% captive bred.  Recent protection by many southeastern states has curbed this exploitation but illegal harvest for local consumption may still threaten some populations.

Gallery

References 

Ernst, C.H., R.W. Barbour and J.E. Lovich. 1994. Turtles of the United States and Canada. Washington, D.C., Smithsonian Institution Press.
Hubbs, C. 1995. Springs and spring runs as unique aquatic systems. Copeia. 1995(4): 989–991.
Reed, R.N. and J.W. Gibbons. 2004. Conservation status of live U.S. nonmarine turtles in  domestic and international trade – a report to: U.S. Department of the Interior and U.S. Fish and Wildlife Service. Aiken, SC, Savannah River Ecology Lab: 1-92.

Bibliography

Pseudemys

fr:Pseudemys floridana
ja:ペニンシュラクーター
ru:Полуостровная черепаха